The Martin Barrett House, at 733 S. Pacific in Dillon, Montana, USA, was built in 1912. It was the retirement home of the politician and pioneer rancher Martin Barrett and his wife. It was listed on the National Register of Historic Places in 1987.

The eclectic house shows early 20th century architecture in Dillon. It is a two-story square plan building, with red brick facing over wood frame, which reflects influences of Colonial Revival and Prairie School styles.

References

		
National Register of Historic Places in Beaverhead County, Montana
Colonial Revival architecture in Montana
Prairie School architecture
Houses completed in 1912